A referendum on councils and treasury was held in the United States Virgin Islands on 2 November 1948. Governor William H. Hastie had requested the local parliament to draw up six referendum questions.  While this referendum was held alongside elections, turnout was only 60% that of the general election.

Results

Territorial Legislature

Independent Councils

Common Treasury

Separate Treasuries

Popular election of the Governor

Representative in US Congress

References

1948 referendums
Referendums in the United States Virgin Islands
1948 elections in the Caribbean
1948 in the United States Virgin Islands